This article presents the discography of all albums and singles released by the American pop-rock group The Partridge Family. It includes eight studio albums including one holiday release, plus five compilations and 11 singles.

The Partridge Family were a pop music act linked to the popular 1970–74 ABC-TV television series The Partridge Family, featuring lead and backing vocals respectively by the programme's stars David Cassidy and Shirley Jones, plus professional backing vocalists and session musicians. The other four cast members portraying the TV family featured on several of the album covers but did not participate in the recordings.  The "group" recorded from 1970 to 1973 and in late 1970 topped the Billboard Hot 100 chart with the debut single "I Think I Love You", which NARM declared the year's best-selling single. In 1971 the Partridge Family were Grammy-nominated for the Best New Artist of 1970.

The Partridge Family's 1972 and 1973 single releases fared much better in the UK than in the US, coinciding with David Cassidy's phenomenal UK standing as a solo star during this period. "Breaking Up Is Hard to Do" was released in the UK in 1972 as a Maxi single with "I Think I Love You" on the same side and "I'll Meet You Halfway" on the B-side. It reached No 3 in the UK charts

Albums

Studio albums

Compilations

Singles

Notes

References

Discography
Film and television discographies
Discographies of American artists
Pop music discographies